Yilmar Andrés Herrera Madera (born 29 April 1996 in El Bagre) is a Colombian sprinter specialising in the 400 metres. He represented his country at the 2017 World Championships without qualifying for the semifinals. In addition, he won the bronze medal at the 2017 South American Championships.

His personal best in the event is 45.48 seconds set in Medellín in 2017.

Before taking up athletics he was a basketball player.

International competitions

References

External links 
 

1996 births
Living people
Colombian male sprinters
World Athletics Championships athletes for Colombia
Sportspeople from Antioquia Department
Athletes (track and field) at the 2018 South American Games
South American Games gold medalists for Colombia
South American Games silver medalists for Colombia
South American Games medalists in athletics
Central American and Caribbean Games bronze medalists for Colombia
Competitors at the 2018 Central American and Caribbean Games
Central American and Caribbean Games medalists in athletics
South American Games gold medalists in athletics
21st-century Colombian people